Albert Cyril Ross (7 October 1916 – 1998) was an English footballer who played as a full back.

Career
In 1933, at the age of 17, Ross began his career at Arsenal, playing for the club's reserves. The following year, Ross returned north to sign for Gainsborough Trinity. In 1935, Ross joined Middlesbrough. At the club, Ross made eleven Football League appearances, before departing in March 1937 to sign for Bradford (Park Avenue). Ahead of the 1938–39 season, Ross signed for newly formed Chelmsford City, before joining Chester City before the start of the season. At Chester, Ross made a singular appearance, before joining Scarborough in July 1939.

References

1916 births
1998 deaths
Association football defenders
Footballers from York
English footballers
Arsenal F.C. players
Gainsborough Trinity F.C. players
Middlesbrough F.C. players
Bradford (Park Avenue) A.F.C. players
Chelmsford City F.C. players
Chester City F.C. players
Scarborough F.C. players
English Football League players